Ramer Sumati is a 1985 Bangladeshi drama film starring Bobita and Joy in lead roles. Prabir Mitra plays grandfather's role.  This is the debut film of actor Sadek Bachchu.

Synopsis
Ram is a teenage boy who is very precocious and wicked. He keeps on creating havocs for villagers. Today he has stolen the fruit of someone's tree, so tomorrow the complaint that he stole the fish from someone's pond is always coming. His elder brother Shyam works under the zamindar. His wife dominates him. He only obeys his wife Narayani. One day when he got into a dispute with the zamindar's son, Narayani fought with him and stopped talking to him. Disappointed at this, he realizes his mistake when he loses his relationship with his relatives and decides to leave the village with all his property to his nephew and move to his mama's house.

Cast
 Joy - Ramlal
 Babita - Narayani / Boudi
 Prabir Mitra - Shyamlal
 Suchanda - Netra
 Raushan Jamil - Narayani's mother
 Nargis - Flame
 Sadeq Bachchu - Naresh
 Saifuddin - Jageshwar
 Ashish Kumar Loh - Priest
 ATM Shamsuzzaman - School teacher
 Obaidul Haque Sarkar - Zamindar
 Dulari Chakraborty - Naresh's mother
 Himanshu Das Himu
 Kali Babu
 Paran Babu
 Nani Das

Soundtrack
The film's songs have been composed by Mansur Ahmed whereas lyrics were penned by Masud Karim.

Awards
Bangladesh National Films Awards

 Winner: Bangladesh National Film Award for Best Child Artist - Joy
 Winner: Bangladesh National Film Award for Best Actress - Bobita

See also
 Sarat Chandra Chattopadhyay

References

External Links
 

1985 films
Bengali-language Bangladeshi films
Films scored by Mansur Ahmed